Notoreas isoleuca is a species of moth in the family Geometridae. It is endemic to New Zealand.

Taxonomy
This species was first described in 1897 by Edward Meyrick using material collected in Castle Hill by George Hudson. Meyrick temporarily suppressed this taxon in 1905 having come to the conclusion that it was a form of N. mechanitis but after a close study of the group Meyrick reinstated it in 1911.  Hudson also discussed and illustrated this species in his 1928 book The Butterflies and Moths of New Zealand.  

The genus Notoreas was reviewed in 1986 by R. C. Craw and the placement of this species within it was confirmed. However some experts regard this species as being of dubious taxonomic status and in need of further taxonomic investigation. The holotype specimen is held at the Natural History Museum, London.

Description 

Meyrick described the species as follows:

Distribution 
This species is endemic to New Zealand. N. isoleuca has been found around Arthur's Pass and Ben Lomond as well as Mount Peel.

Life cycle and behaviour 
This species normally produces two broods per year but it has been hypothesised that at some localities it may produce only once in a season. The female moth lays her eggs within the flower buds of their host plant. When the larvae emerge from their eggs, they eat into the leaves or buds of their host, hiding from predators. Once they are large enough, they emerge to feed from the fresh growth of the plant. N. elegans pupate in a loose cocoon on the ground under their host. The species spends approximately 43 days in their cocoon before emerging as an adult. N. isoleuca are day-flying moths. They are low but fast flyers and constantly vibrate their wings to enable them to take off rapidly.

Host species 
The host plants for the larvae of Notoreas isoleuca are endemic species within the genus Kelleria.

Biology and behaviour 
This day-flying species is on the wing from January to March.

References

Larentiinae
Moths described in 1897
Moths of New Zealand
Endemic fauna of New Zealand
Taxa named by Edward Meyrick
Endemic moths of New Zealand